The ACT-CIS Partylist, officially the Anti-Crime and Terrorism Community Involvement and Support Partylist, is a political organization which has party-list representation in the House of Representatives of the Philippines. They are supported primarily by radio and television broadcasters brothers Raffy Tulfo and Erwin Tulfo.

In the 2019 National Elections, ACT-CIS got the most number of votes in the party-list race with 2,651,987 votes.

Electoral performance

Representatives to Congress

Criticism
Election watchdog Kontra Daya claims that representation of marginalized groups is not a function that ACT-CIS serves given that the group’s second nominee Jocelyn Tulfo is the sister-in-law of Ramon Tulfo, the Philippine President's special envoy to China. She also has ties with former tourism secretary Wanda Tulfo Teo, who was implicated in allegations of an anomalous government transaction, according to Kontra Daya.

External links
  (Archived)

References

Party-lists represented in the House of Representatives of the Philippines
Conservative parties in the Philippines